The Northwest Territories/Yukon Scotties Tournament of Hearts was the regional women's curling championship for the Northwest Territories and Yukon. The winning team represented Team Northwest Territories/Yukon at the Scotties Tournament of Hearts until 2014. Beginning in 2015, both territories were awarded direct entries to the Scotties.

Past winners

See also
Northwest Territories Scotties Tournament of Hearts
Yukon Scotties Tournament of Hearts 

Scotties Tournament of Hearts provincial tournaments
Curling in the Northwest Territories
Curling in Yukon